Amy Olymbia Charkowski is an American plant pathologist and Professor of Plant Pathology at Colorado State University. She was elected Fellow of the American Association for the Advancement of Science in 2020.

Early life and education 
Charkowski was born in Madison. She stayed close to home for her undergraduate studies, focussing on biochemistry and plant pathology at the University of Wisconsin–Madison. Whilst she had long been interested in biology, it was during her undergraduate degree that she first worked in a plant virology laboratory. She has recalled visiting the hydroponic farms at Epcot with her family. Her first undergraduate research experience involved bean and pepper diseases. After earning her bachelor's degree she moved to Cornell University, where she studied the hypersensitive response and pathogenicity system. After graduating she worked at the United States Department of Agriculture research service where she worked on food safety research.

Research and career 
After a short spell at the USDA Charkowski returned to the University of Wisconsin–Madison, where she studied how microbes manipulate plants. As part of her role at the University of Wisconsin–Madison, Charkowski directs the Wisconsin Seed Potato Certification program, which oversees the certification of seeds produced by farmers in Wisconsin. Wisconsin growers are responsible for the production of around $16 million worth of seed potatoes planted across the United States per year, with around 8% of United States potatoes able to be traced back to the  Charkowski's program. Her innovations with the Wisconsin Seed Potato Certification programme include ensuring the laws surrounding seed production meet international standards, the implementation of a hydroponics programme and applying scientific programmes to detect for potato pathogens. As part of these efforts, Charkowski leads the $8.3M USDA Specialty Crops Research Initiative.

Charkowski has worked to understand and control the broad host range pathogens Pectobacterium and Dickeya. These diseases attack potato crops in Wisconsin, causing potatoes to rot. Charkowski has sequenced the genome of the Pectobacterium taxa, allowing systematic investigations into the role of the bacterial genes that are up-regulated in rotating tubers.

In her investigations of the genome of Pectobacterium, Charkowski identified that the bacteria delivered a single effector protein (DspE) into host cells. In plants that can recognise the effector protein, DspE can trigger a resistive response. Certain species of potato can resist the killing effects of the DspE whilst simultaneously attacking the Pectobacterium. She has tried to move the defensive genes that can recognise DspE into other potatoes and crop plants as a means to destroy pathogens. In 2016 Charkowski moved to Colorado State University as Professor and Department Chair.

Awards and honours 

 2011 American Phytopathological Society Syngenta Award
 2016 Elected Fellow of the American Phytopathological Society
 2020 Elected Fellow of the American Association for the Advancement of Science

Select publications

Personal life 
Charkowski is married. She is a passionate explorer, and takes part in hiking, biking and kayaking.

References

External links 
Charkowski's Twitter profile

Living people
American phytopathologists
Women phytopathologists
University of Wisconsin–Madison alumni
Cornell University alumni
Colorado State University faculty
University of Wisconsin–Madison faculty
People from Madison, Wisconsin
Fellows of the American Association for the Advancement of Science
Scientists from Wisconsin
21st-century American scientists
21st-century American women scientists
American women academics
1971 births